Khalfan is a given name. Notable people with the name include:

Khalfan Ibrahim (born 1988), Qatar footballer
Khalfan Khamis Mohamed (born 1974), Tanzanian national, one of numerous al-Qaeda suspects
Mohammed Khalfan Bin Kharbash, former minister of finance and industry of the United Arab Emirates
Salim Abdallah Khalfan, Member of Parliament in the National Assembly of Tanzania
Talal Khalfan (born 1980), Omani footballer